This is a list of railway lines in Russia.

Main lines and their divisions

Russian Railways is by far the largest and owns many of the other railways

East Siberian Railway
Irkutsk Railway Division
Severobaykalsk Railway Division
Tayshet Railway Division
Ulan-Ude Railway Division
Far Eastern Railway
Khabarovsk Railway Division
Komsomolsk Railway Division
Sakhalin Railway Division
Tynda Railway Division
Vladivostok Railway Division
Gorky Railway
Gorky Railway Division
Izhevsk Railway Division
Kazan Railway Division
Kirov Railway Division
Murom Railway Division
Kaliningrad Railway
Krasnoyarsk Railway
Abakan Railway Division
Krasnoyarsk Railway Division
Kuybyshev Railway
Bashkir Railway Division
Penza Railway Division
Samara Railway Division
Ulyanovsk Railway Division
Moscow Railway
Bryansk Railway Division
Moscow-Kursk Railway Division
Moscow-Ryazan Railway Division
Moscow-Smolensk Railway Division
Oryol-Kursk Railway Division
Smolensk Railway Division
Tula Railway Division
North Caucasus Railway
Grozny Railway Division
Krasnodar Railway Division
Makhachkala Railway Division
Mineralnye Vody Railway Division
Rostov Railway Division
Northern Railway
Arkhangelsk Railway Division
Solvychegodsk Railway Division
Sosnogorsk Railway Division
Vologda Railway Division
Yaroslavl Railway Division
Oktyabrskaya Railway
Moscow Railway Division
Murmansk Railway Division
Petrozavodsk Railway Division
Saint Petersburg Railway Division
Saint Petersburg-Vitebsk Railway Division
Volkhovstroy Railway Division
South-Eastern Railway
Belgorod Railway Division
Liski Railway Division
Michurinsk Railway Division
Rtishchevo Railway Division
Yelets Railway Division
South Urals Railway
Chelyabinsk Railway Division
Kartaly Railway Division
Kurgan Railway Division
Orenburg Railway Division
Petropavlovsk Railway Division
Sverdlovsk Railway
Nizhny Tagil Railway Division
Perm Railway Division
Surgut Railway Division
Sverdlovsk Railway Division
Tyumen Railway Division
Trans-Baikal Railway
Chita Railway Division
Mogocha Railway Division
Svobodny Railway Division
Volga Railway
Astrakhan Railway Division
Saratov Railway Division
Volgograd Railway Division
West Siberian Railway
Altay Railway Division
Kuzbass Railway Division
Novosibirsk Railway Division
Omsk Railway Division

Fragments of main lines and historical lines
Alma-Ata Railway (a section runs in Altai Krai, Russia)
Amur Railway
Baikal Amur Mainline
Baltic Railway (a section runs in Kaliningrad Oblast, Russia)
Connecting Line
Kemerovo Railway
Krugobaikalskaya Railway
Mid-Siberian Railway
Moscow-Brest Railway
Moscow-Kazan Railway
Moscow-Kiev-Voronezh Railway
Moscow-Kursk Railway
Moscow-Nizhny Novgorod Railway 
Moscow Ring Railway
Moscow-Saint Petersburg Railway
Moscow-Vindava-Rybinsk Railway
Murmansk-Nikel Railway
Murom Railway
Nikolayevskaya Railway
Northern Donetsk Railway (a section runs in Kursk Oblast, Russia)
North Western Railways
Perm Railway
Polesia Railways (a section runs in Bryansk Oblast, Russia)
Primorskaya railway (joined Oktyabrskaya Railway in 1925)
Ozerki line
Primorskaya line
Tovarnaya line
Riga-Oryol Railway
Ryazan-Urals Railway
Saint Peterburg-Warsaw Railway
Saint Petersburg-Hiitola railroad
Salekhard-Igarka Railway
Siberian Railway
Syzran-Vyazma Railway
Tashkent Railway (a sections runs in Orenburg and Samara Oblasts, Russia)
Trans-Siberian Railway
Tsarskoye Selo Railway
Turkestan-Siberia Railway
Ussuri Railway
Vladikavkaz Railway
Vyborg-Joensuu railroad
West Kazakhstan Railway (a section runs in Orenburg Oblast, Russia)

See also
 Children's railway an extracurricular educational institution, where teenagers learn railway professions. 
 The Museum of the Moscow Railway

Russia
 
Lines